Roopville is a town in Carroll County, Georgia, United States. The population was 218 at the 2010 census.

History 
Roopville was founded in 1881 by John K. Roop, and named for him. The Georgia General Assembly incorporated Roopville as a town in 1885.

Geography

Demographics

As of the census of 2000, there were 177 people, 75 households, and 57 families residing in the town. The racial makeup of the town was 83.05% White, 15.82% African American, and 1.13% from two or more races.

There were 75 households, out of which 26.7% had children under the age of 18 living with them, 60.0% were married couples living together, 10.7% had a female householder with no husband present, and 22.7% were non-families. 20.0% of all households were made up of individuals, and 14.7% had someone living alone who was 65 years of age or older. The average household size was 2.36 and the average family size was 2.69.

In the town, the population was spread out, with 20.3% under the age of 18, 6.2% from 18 to 24, 24.9% from 25 to 44, 29.9% from 45 to 64, and 18.6% who were 65 years of age or older. The median age was 43 years. For every 100 females, there were 98.9 males. For every 100 females age 18 and over, there were 90.5 males.

The median income for a household in the town was $32,917, and the median income for a family was $30,625. Males had a median income of $35,227 versus $20,938 for females. The per capita income for the town was $16,521.  About 12.7% of families and 17.4% of the population were below the poverty line, including 38.5% of those under the age of eighteen and 12.8% of those 65 or over.

Notable person
Keith Jackson (1928-2018), sportscaster

Notable resident
Donna Fiducia, News / Media Personality

References

Towns in Carroll County, Georgia
Towns in Georgia (U.S. state)